"Tremble for My Beloved" is a song by the American rock band Collective Soul. It is the fourth and final single from their fourth studio album Dosage.

Background
Commenting on the creation of "Tremble for My Beloved" and its meaning, Ed Roland said:

Twilight
In 2008, over nine years after the song's release, "Tremble for My Beloved" was featured in the film Twilight as well as on its accompanying soundtrack. Following the film's success, the song's exposure earned Collective Soul new popularity among a younger audience.

Commenting on Twilight'''s impact on the band in an interview in 2012, Will Turpin said:

Reissue and music video
In December 2010, a re-recorded version of "Tremble for My Beloved" was released as both a single and a music video on iTunes. The music video was also included on the DVD Music Videos and Performances from The Twilight Saga Soundtracks, Vol. 1. The video was shot in August 2010 during a performance in Arequipa, Peru.

Live performances
"Tremble for My Beloved" was the opening song for the Dosage Tour in 1999. The band also performed the song on The Tonight Show with Jay Leno in September that year. The song would remain off of the band's set lists for many years, with the exception of a few concerts performed in 2005. When the song regained popularity from the success of Twilight in 2008, the band began performing it live again the following year. As it was for the Dosage Tour in 1999, the song was used as the opener for the Dosage Tour 2012.

Cover version
Vitamin String Quartet recorded a cover version for their Twilight tribute album, Vitamin String Quartet Performs Music from Twilight'' (2008).

Charts

References

External links

1999 singles
1999 songs
2010 singles
Atlantic Records singles
Collective Soul songs
Songs from The Twilight Saga (film series)
Songs written by Ed Roland